The Estonian Defence League is the name of the unified paramilitary armed forces of the Republic of Estonia. The Defence League is a paramilitary defence organization whose aim is to guarantee the preservation of the independence and sovereignty of the state, the integrity of its land area and its constitutional order.

The Defence League possesses arms and engages in military exercises, fulfilling the tasks given to it by the law. The organization is divided into 4 Territorial Defence Districts that consist of 15 Defence League regional units, called malevs, whose areas of responsibility mostly coincide with the borders of Estonian counties.

Mission

The Defence League is a voluntary military national defence organisation, which acts in the area of government of the Ministry of Defence. The Defence League possesses arms and engages in military exercises. The main goal of the Defence League is, on the basis of the citizens’ free will and initiative, to enhance the readiness of the nation to defend its independence and its constitutional order, including in the event of military threat.

The Defence League plays an important role in supporting the civil structures. Its members aid in putting out wildfires, volunteer as assistant police members, and ensure safety at various events. Units, consisting of voluntary members of the Defence League, also participate in international peace support operations such as in the Balkan states. The Defence League and its affiliated organisations have positive relations with partner organisations in the Nordic countries, the United States, and the United Kingdom.

History

1918 – The Estonian Defence League was preceded by Estonia's first armed home defence organisation, the Omakaitse (Citizens' Defence Organisation, German Bürgerwehr) against the public disorder accompanying the Russian Revolution.
1918 – On 11 November the Citizens' Defence Organisation was renamed the Estonian Defence League which performed the tasks of a national guard in the War of Independence.
1924 – The attempted Communist coup on December 1 was opposed by  the Defence League. Development of the Defence League for the performance of tasks of national defence was started.
1925 – In October the Estonian Defence League magazine "Kaitse Kodu!" ("Defend Your Home!") was founded.
1926 – On 19–20 June the first Estonian Defence League Festival took place in Tallinn, to be followed by six more such events held before 1940.
1927 – To develop the Defence League and give it a family dimension, the Commander of the Defence League approved the temporary statutes of the Women's Home Defence.
1928 – The Body of Elders decided to invite the boy scout organisation the Young Eagles to join the Defence League.
1931 – The Government of the Republic approved the Statutes of the Defence League which have remained in force until the present day.
1932 – The Girl Scout organisation Home Daughters was established at the Women's Home Defence.
1934 – To regulate the life and work of the organisation, House Rules of the Defence League were adopted.
1940 – With the Soviet occupation starting from 17 June, the liquidation of both the Republic of Estonia and the Defence League started.
1941 - The Defence League reformed with the declaration of war between the Soviet Union and Nazi Germany, and was suborned under Wehrmacht commanders. 
1943 - The Defence League was made compulsory for men between the ages of 17 and 45 not otherwise fit for service in the German Armed Forces. 
1944 - The maximum age of compulsory service was raised to 60 in January, and when Nazi Germany withdrew from mainland Estonia, the members largely returned to their homes. However, the members who got evacuated to Germany were sent to the 20th Waffen Grenadier Division of the SS (1st Estonian). 
1974 – Defence League in exile was founded by  Estonian Minister of War in exile Avdy Andresson in the United States 
1990 – The Defence League was re-founded on 17 February at Järvakandi on popular initiative in order to defend Estonia's independent statehood.
1991 – On 4 September the Presidium of the Supreme Council of the Republic of Estonia reinstated the rights of the Defence League as a legal organization, days after its personnel were deployed as the Soviet Airborne Troops occupied the Tallinn TV Tower but owing to EDL personnel deployed to the signal rooms, did not disrupt the radio broadcasts.
1992 – On 28 April the Defence League was included in the Defence Forces as a national defence organisation.

In 1999 the Estonian Parliament adopted the EDL Law, which provided the position of the Kaitseliit in society and national defence and also described its main tasks, structure, legal basis for operations and control and co-operation with the Defence Forces, Police, and other state organizations.

Organization
The organisation is divided into 4 Territorial Defence Districts (maakaitseringkond) that consist of 15 Defence League regional units (malev) whose areas of responsibility mostly coincide with the borders of Estonia’s counties.

In case of mobilization, each of the districts will form a battalion sized maneuver unit.

 Northern Territorial Defence District: Tallinn, Harju and Rapla malevs
 Northeastern Territorial Defence District: Alutaguse, Viru, Jõgeva and Järva malevs
 Southern Territorial Defence District: Põlva, Sakala, Tartu, Valgamaa and Võrumaa malevs
 Western Territorial Defence District: Pärnumaa, Lääne and Saaremaa malevs

Today, the Defence League has over 15,000 reservists. The affiliated organisations of the Defence League combine more than 25,000 volunteers, in all, and include the Estonian Defence League’s women’s corps Naiskodukaitse, the Estonian Defence League’s boys’ corps Noored Kotkad, and the Estonian Defence League’s girls’ corps Kodutütred.

Subunits – youth and women's corps

Womens Voluntary Defence Organization (WVDO)
WVDO –  is an organisation within Kaitseliit.  Every member of WVDO has a function/task in a case of crises (civilian or armed)

 Military defence - every member has the option to contribute in a military unit as a combatant
 Comprehensive national defence - evacuation units  civil defence affairs (courses, app), We Salute! campaign to support veterans, youth work, co-operation with MoI (Rescue Board, Police and Boarder Guard, Emergency Response Centre etc.)
 Communit member - Member of WVDO with skills and knowledge of basic training is able to cope in all situations and different crises. Willing to take initiative and responsibility in all stages of crises. Empowerment of women!
Defence League’s girls’ corps – "Home Daughters"

The Defence League’s girls’ corps –  was established to increase patriotic feelings and readiness to defend the independence of Estonia among young girls; to enhance the love for home and fatherland; to encourage respect for the Estonian language and ways of thinking; to be honest, enterprising, responsible, and capable of decision-making; to respect nature; and to respect one’s parents and others.

Defence League’s boys’ corps – "Young Eagles"

The Defence League’s boys’ corps – Noored Kotkad. The objective of the organisation is to raise these young people as good citizens with healthy bodies and minds. In addition to numerous interesting activities, such as parachute jumping, flying gliders, orienteering, shooting weapons, etc., the boys’ corps also participates in numerous events, the most popular but also the most difficult being the Mini-Erna 35 km reconnaissance competition.

Culture

The Estonian Victory Day (1919) has been celebrated until WWII with military parades, organized by the Kaitseliit. Since 2000, Victory Day parades have been organized by Kaitseliit again every June 23. The 2015 parade also saw a rising number of military contingents from NATO countries take part: Latvia, the United States, Finland, Poland and Sweden, while 2016, aside from the US and Latvian troops also featured new contingents from Lithuania and Denmark.

In 2006, the first Fleet Review in Estonian history was conducted by Kaitseliit in June in Saaremaa.

In 2016, the Sakala subdivision of Estonian Defence League formed the first Estonian military pipe band and their first performance was during the yearly Victory Day parade the same year. Band uses 4 sets of drums and 12 special sets of "war pipes" made by Andres Taul. Idea for such a unit originally came from President Lennart Meri in 2001 whilst he was visiting the Viljandi Folk Music Festival. The idea was later revived by President Toomas Hendrik Ilves in 2010 and Ando Kiviberg, notable local piper and head of Viljandi's folk festival, was assigned to form the band. According to Kiviberg one of the goals of the band is also to promote bagpipes amongst males, as Estonia is lacking male pipers.

Personnel

Leadership
The Commander of Defence League  is the highest-ranking officer of the Defence League; though he may not be the senior officer by time in grade. The Commander has the responsibility to man, training, equip and develop the organization. He does not serve as a direct battlefield commander. The Commander is a member and head of the Chief of Staff which is the main organizational tool of the Commander. The Commander is appointed by the Commander of the Defence Forces or by the Supreme Commander in Chief of the Defence Forces. The current Commandant is Brigadier general Riho Ühtegi, who assumed the position in 2019. As of 2020, Colonel Eero Rebo is the Defence League Chief of Staff.

Ranks and insignia
Officially abolished in 2013. Estonian Defence League now uses ranks and insignia identical to the Land Forces.

Uniforms

Standard uniforms of the Estonian Defence Forces are the ESTDCU issued to Defence League personnel. On some festive occasions (such as parades), white armbands with the insignia of the given territorial unit are worn. Civilian uniforms are worn by the women's division during parades and ceremonies.

Armbands have also previously been worn on civilian clothing to distinguish members of the Defence League from civilians during periods when Defence League units did not have sufficient inventories to supply every member with a uniform (during World War I; and in the beginning of the 1990s).

Equipment

The basic infantry weapon of the Defence League is the 5.56mm LMT R-20 Rahe, but the majority of the memberbase is equipped with the 7.62mm G3 rifle and its variants. The G3-based rifles are being phased out in favour of the R-20 Rahe in Territorial Defence maneuver units while backline units will retain the G3.

Suppressive fire is provided by the Ksp 58, MG3 machine guns and M2 Browning heavy machine guns. Squad level anti-tank capabilities are provided with 84mm Carl Gustav recoilless rifles. In addition, indirect fire is provided by 81mm and 120mm mortars on battlegroup level.

Defence League battlegroups also include dedicated anti-tank units equipped with 90mm Pvpj 1110 anti-tank guns and FGM-148 Javelin ATGMs. The Defence League utilizes a variety of tactical transport vehicles and a small number of BTR-80 armoured personnel carriers.

See also
Territorial Forces (Finland)
Home Guard (Sweden)
Latvian National Guard
Lithuanian National Defence Volunteer Forces

References

External links
Estonian Defence League, official webpage
Estonian Defence League School
Estonian Defence League Girl's corp, official page in Estonian
Estonian Defence League Women's corp, official page in English
Estonian Defence League Boy's corp, official page in Estonian

Militias in Europe
 
Estonian War of Independence
Paramilitary organizations
Paramilitary organizations based in Estonia
Military units and formations established in 1918
Military units and formations disestablished in 1940
Military units and formations established in 1991
1918 establishments in Estonia